Herman Paul Starrette (November 20, 1936 – June 2, 2017) was an American relief pitcher; pitching and bullpen coach; and farm system official in Major League Baseball. Starrette was a native and lifelong resident of Statesville, North Carolina. He attended Lenoir Rhyne College in nearby Hickory.

Starrette played his nine-year (1958–66) pitching career in the Baltimore Orioles organization, and spent parts of three seasons (1963–65) at the Major League level. Appearing in 27 MLB games, he pitched in 46 innings and split two decisions with an earned run average of 2.54.  He allowed 43 hits and 16 bases on balls, struck out 21 and earned one save.

His coaching career began with the Orioles' Triple-A farm club, the Rochester Red Wings, in 1967, and the following season he succeeded George Bamberger as Baltimore's roving minor league pitching instructor. The Orioles' system of the time was celebrated for developing young pitching, and after six seasons in that job, Starrette became a Major League pitching coach for the 1974 Atlanta Braves. He would spend the next 28 years as a pitching coach, bullpen coach, minor league instructor, coordinator of instruction, and farm system director with the Braves, Orioles, San Francisco Giants, Philadelphia Phillies, Milwaukee Brewers, Chicago Cubs, Montreal Expos and Boston Red Sox. He was the pitching coach of the 1980 world champion Phillies.

Starrette was a trusted associate of Dan Duquette, working with him in Milwaukee, Montreal and Boston as a farm system official and minor and Major League coach. After Duquette's ouster as general manager in Boston in February 2002, Starrette retired from baseball.

Starrette died June 2, 2017.

References 

 Boston Red Sox 2001 media guide.
 Marcin, Joe, and Byers, Dick, eds., The Baseball Register, 1977 edition. St. Louis: The Sporting News.

External links

Herm Starrette at  Baseball Almanac

  
  
  
 
  
  
  

1936 births
2017 deaths
Aberdeen Pheasants players
Atlanta Braves coaches
Baltimore Orioles coaches
Baltimore Orioles players
Baseball players from North Carolina
Boston Red Sox coaches
Chicago Cubs coaches
Elmira Pioneers players
Fox Cities Foxes players
Lenoir–Rhyne Bears baseball players
Major League Baseball bullpen coaches
Major League Baseball pitchers
Major League Baseball pitching coaches
Milwaukee Brewers coaches
People from Statesville, North Carolina
Philadelphia Phillies coaches
Rochester Red Wings players
San Francisco Giants coaches
Stockton Ports players
Vancouver Mounties players